The Hungarian Men's Curling Championship is the national championship of men's curling teams in Hungary. It has been held annually since 2003.

List of champions and medallists
Teams line-up in order: fourth, third, second, lead, alternate; skips marked bold.

References

See also
Hungarian Women's Curling Championship
Hungarian Mixed Doubles Curling Championship
Hungarian Mixed Curling Championship

Curling competitions in Hungary
Curling
Recurring sporting events established in 2003
2003 establishments in Hungary
National curling championships